Bedford Road Collegiate is a public high school on the west side of the city of Saskatoon, Saskatchewan. It is Saskatoon's second oldest high school, opened on February 12, 1923. It is also known as BRCI (Bedford Road Collegiate Institute), or Bedford. Bedford Road Collegiate is part of the Saskatoon Public School Division.

Currently its feeder schools are Caswell Community School, Henry Kelsey School, King George Community School, Mayfair Community School,and Westmount Community School.

Campus

The school is shaped in the form of 2 concentric squares on top of each other, with the lower floor containing the gymnasium, auditorium, offices, as well as the music department, shop classroom and general purpose classrooms. In the lower square's center, the library is located. The upper floor contains the science department, art department, computer labs and general purpose classrooms. The lower square also contains the office department and conference rooms. a large commons area is also present on the lower floor. There is an in-campus restaurant called Redhawk Roost in the commons. In the past, two vending machines could be found near the auditorium. These vending machines were faulty and often failed to give change. The vending machines have been replaced as of September 2019, with two new vending machines taking their place. While the new vending machines do work better, many students have expressed disdain at the raised prices and lower quality in food.

Redmen name and logo

In the early 1960s, an "Indian Head" logo was adopted as the sports team logo for the school in addition to the original "Lantern" logo. In the mid-1990s, a campaign was started to change the "Redmen" name and the "Indian Head" logo claiming they are a "human rights violations." Some First Nations academics and alumni consider the use of "Redmen" to be outdated and offensive. In 1996, a student vote ended overwhelmingly in favor of keeping the name and logo. The school has consulted with students, parents, community members, school staff, First Nations and Métis elders and leaders about the logo and team name on a number of occasions. Each time, the majority of the stakeholders wanted to retain the name and the logo. However, in 2011, the campaign against the logo was revived via Facebook, gaining national media attention and causing the Saskatoon Public School Division to reconsider the logo. In early 2013, protesters attempted to demonstrate at the Bedford Road Invitational Tournament, but they were blocked by teachers and police from entering. A new logo was launched during the 2013 BRCI graduation. According to the school, the design changes are meant to represent various aspect of First Nation culture and heritage.

In March 2014, the Saskatoon public school board passed a motion to have the school drop the name "Redmen" and use a new name by the beginning of the new school year in September. The new name for Bedford Road, as chosen by a group of 70 staff, students, and alumni, will be the Redhawks, drawing on the red tail hawk native to Saskatchewan.

Student life

Athletics
Bedford Road Collegiate's sports teams are known as the Redhawks, and (although less commonly used today) "Lady Redhawks" for female teams. Athletic programs include football, cheerleading, wrestling, basketball, soccer, badminton, track & field, golf, and cross country. Bedford Road also hosts sports tournaments the Redhawks Classic and Redhawks Volley, along with BRIT.

BRIT
The Bedford Road Invitational Tournament (BRIT) is a boys' basketball tournament held by the school every year since 1968, attracting national and international high school teams to Saskatoon. There is also a cheerleading and dance competition component to the tournament.

Notable alumni
 Ethel Catherwood, Olympic track and field gold medalist
 Michael Garnett, hockey player for Traktor Chelyabinsk of the KHL
 William Leonard Higgitt, RCMP Commissioner
 Roy Romanow, Premier of Saskatchewan (1991–2001)
 Lefty Wilkie, Major League Baseball player

School song
Students at Bedford Road Collegiate traditionally sing the school song, which is adapted from the Notre Dame Victory March.  "Red and white" refers to Bedford's school colours.

We'll stand and cheer for the old red and white
And we'll defend her with all our might
We're from Bedford and we're proud
To echo her praises long and loud
Though we may wander o'er land and sea (hey!)
Our old collegiate she'll always be
We'll fight, fight, fight, with all our might
For the spirit of Bedford Road

References

External links
Saskatoon Public Schools
Welcome to BRCI

High schools in Saskatoon
Educational institutions established in 1923
1923 establishments in Saskatchewan